Røvatnet is a lake in Narvik Municipality in Nordland county, Norway. The Røvatnet lake supports a population of Arctic char. It is sometimes possible to do ice fishing at this lake as late as June. Røvatnet is located on Norwegian state property and therefore fishing at this site is open to the public.

See also
List of lakes in Norway

References

Ballangen
Lakes of Nordland